This Time Tomorrow is a BBC National Lottery game show broadcast on BBC One from 5 July to 23 August 2008, hosted by Tess Daly.

Ratings

References

External links

2008 British television series debuts
2008 British television series endings
2000s British game shows
BBC television game shows
British game shows about lotteries